Viitivka is a village in Haisyn Raion, Vinnytsia Oblast, Ukraine. The village has a population of 4,434.

Populated places established in 1625
Olgopolsky Uyezd

Villages in Haisyn Raion